Nati Azaria (born May 31, 1967) is a former Israeli footballer and now manager.

Azaria was a striker who scored over 100 goals in a career that lasted 15 years.

References

Statistics

External links

1967 births
Living people
Israeli Jews
Israeli footballers
Maccabi Netanya F.C. players
Hapoel Kfar Saba F.C. players
Hapoel Tayibe F.C. players
Hapoel Iksal F.C. players
Maccabi Sha'arayim F.C. players
Maccabi Netanya F.C. managers
Footballers from Netanya
Association football forwards
Israeli football managers